Eternally Confused and Eager for Love is an Indian comedy-drama streaming television series created and directed by Rahul Nair. Produced by Farhan Akhtar, Ritesh Sidhwani, Zoya Akhtar and Reema Kagti under the banner of Excel Entertainment and Tiger Baby Films. It stars Vihaan Samat, Dalai, Ankur Rathee, Rahul Bose and Suchitra Pillai in supporting roles. The series premiered on Netflix on 18 March 2022.

Plot 
Ray is a young adult navigating through his adulthood. Following his inner voice, 'Wiz', Ray embarked on his journey to understand if he wants sex, love, or a relationship.

Ray struggles to speak comfortably. He is always confused and talks something to himself and answers exactly opposite of what he thought. In the process he always puts himself in awkward situations. He is only child of his parents and lives with them along with a maid named Umesh. 

In office he gels with Varun and is always scolded by his boss Pushpa. He has a childhood friend named Riya with whom he vents out all his confusion and talks with no holding back. 

Riya is quite a social girl and is equally confused as Ray is but she is not awkward. Varun has proposed a girl he met on dating app and is planning to get married to. He always encourages Ray to go talk to girls. 

On the other hand Ray gets himself into difficult position with each girl he meets or wants to see future with. The story unfolds and leaves us with plot twist that Ray finally sleeps with Komal (a fried of Riya who he always has words exchange with) and she being clingy enough to let Ray's parents know about this.

Cast and characters 
 Vihaan Samat as Ray
 Jim Sarbh as Wiz (voiceover)
 Dalai Mulchandani as Riya
 Devika Vatsa as Komal
 Tanya Katyal as Naina
 Kajol Chugh as Sonali
 Namrata Sheth as Pari
 Aaliyah Qureishi as Jia
 Larissa Dsa as Priyanka
 Niharika Lyra Dutt as Ruchika
 Ankur Rathee as Varun
 Rahul Bose as Ray's father
 Suchitra Pillai as Ray's mother
 Faezeh Jalali as Pushpa
 Swati Bakshi as Girl at bar counter 
 Himanee Bhatia
 Ayana Gaziz as Miyu Kibishi

Production

Development
The series was announced in December 2020 and teaser of the series was released on 17 February 2022.

Release
The trailer of the series was released on 18 February 2022 consisting of eight episodes premiered on Netflix on 18 March 2022.

Casting 
Vihaan Samat was cast in the titular role, and was joined by Dalai, Jim Sarbh and Ankur Rathee as the leads. The cast also included Rahul Bose and Suchitra Pillai as Ray's mother.

Episodes

Reception
Kusumita Das of Firstpost stated that "The show is a zeitgeist of the times we live in, but do not go looking for emotional complexities and nuance, On the other side it keeps you occupied but makes you feel empty."

References

External links 
 
 

2022 web series debuts
2022 Indian television series debuts
Indian comedy web series
Indian drama web series
Hindi-language Netflix original programming